Coney Island Creek is a  tidal inlet in Brooklyn, New York City. It was created from a series of streams and inlets by land filling and digging activities starting in the mid-18th century which, by the 19th century, became a  continual strait and a partial mudflat connecting Gravesend Bay and Sheepshead Bay, separating Coney Island from the mainland. The strait was closed off in the early 20th century due to further land development and later construction projects. Today only the western half of Coney Island Creek exists.

Course

Coney Island Creek extends eastward  from Gravesend Bay to Shell Road and separates the west end of Coney Island from the neighborhoods of Gravesend and Bath Beach. The west end of the creek is bordered by Coney Island Creek Park and Kaiser Park on the south side, and Calvert Vaux Park on the north side. The eastern end is bordered by the Shore Parkway on the north side and Neptune Avenue on the south side. The eastern portion of Coney Island Creek runs along private industrial property and several acres formerly owned by Keyspan, the local electricity provider. The creek terminates at Shell Road where a storm sewer emerges from under the road (designated stormwater outfall CI-641 in city plans).

History

Extensions and infilling 
At the time of European settlement the land that makes up the present day Coney Island was several barrier islands with interconnecting waterways that were all constantly changing shape. The waterway that became Coney Island Creek did not originally extend across the back side of the island since part of the land on the west end was a peninsula called Coney Hook. Hubbard's Creek, which ran down the eastern side of the peninsula, connected directly with the ocean. In 1750 a 0.25-mile-long canal (called the "Jamaica Ditch") was dug through the Coney Hook salt-marsh from a creek connecting to Gravesend Bay east to Hubbard's creek. This new waterway, allowing shipping traffic to travel from Jamaica Bay to New York Harbor without having to venture out into the ocean, connected Gravesend Bay and Sheepshead Bay together. The waterway behind the islands was called Gravesend Creek in the early 19th century since it cut below the town of Gravesend (later the name was used interchangeably with "Coney Island Creek").  Eventually Hubbard's and the other creeks and inlets that separated the islands were filled by a combination of natural process and land development, leaving just a single island that came to be called Coney Island and a single creek behind it that came to be called Coney Island Creek.

 
Coney Island Creek was still a minimally navigable waterway over its 3-mile length through the turn of the 20th century. By the early part of the century, industries started to develop around the creek. This resulted in it becoming polluted with substances including arsenic, cyanide, and benzene. The largest polluters included the Brooklyn Yarn Dye Company and the Brooklyn Union Gas Company. 

In a period from the late 19th century through the early 20th century there were plans to turn the creek into the Gravesend Ship Canal.  It would re-dredge the creek into a canal running in a straight east-west line and fill all the marsh land on either side of the creek to expand the urban grid to the edge of the canal.  The plan was eventually abandoned and by 1924 local land owners had filled a portion of the creek. A major section of the creek was further filled in to allow construction of the Belt Parkway in the 1930s. More fill was added in 1962 with the construction of the Verrazzano-Narrows Bridge. This turned Coney Island Creek into an inlet with the western and eastern ends of the island becoming peninsulas. None of the creek remains at the eastern end.  That terminus, Sheepshead Bay, has been dredged and, for the most part, enclosed in bulkheads. The path of the landfill of what used to be the creek follows Shore Parkway, Guider Avenue, and the triangular block between Neptune Avenue and Cass Place to a bulkhead at Sheepshead Bay.

Current status 

A northwestern part of the creek is known as a "ship graveyard" for the dead and abandoned ships found there. At the southern shore of the creek, the remains of a  yellow submarine, the Quester I, protrudes from the water. Built from salvaged metal in the late 1960s, it was never able to maintain an even keel and was abandoned. The creek is also used for performing baptisms.

In 2016, the New York City government found that a nearby apartment complex, Beach Haven Apartments, was dumping  of sewage each day into Coney Island Creek. The complex was fined $400,000 two years later. By late 2016, local residents were advocating the designation of the creek as a Superfund site, which would provide funding to clean the hazardous materials from the creek. Community members testified that auto shops on nearby Neptune Avenue were still dumping cars into the creek. The creek was expected to undergo some minor cleanup between 2018 and 2020. By late 2020, the United States Environmental Protection Agency (EPA) was considering designating the creek as a Superfund site.

In 2018, the Coney Island History Project opened an exhibition about the history of the Coney Island creek titled: “Coney Island Creek and the Natural World.” 

In 2020, the city planned to build a NYC Ferry dock along the creek off Kaiser Park. The ferry dock would be the terminal of a new route to Pier 11/Wall Street; the route, announced in 2019, was to have begun operations in 2021. Local activists rallied against the dock plan, arguing it would disrupt the ecosystems of the creek. There were also concerns that the addition of ferry service would worsen pollution in the creek. The implementation of the Coney Island ferry route was delayed and, in mid-2022, the EDC announced that the ferry route had been postponed indefinitely. One problem was that the sand in the Coney Island Creek shifted frequently, hampering efforts to construct a ferry pier there. Another issue was that the creek itself was heavily polluted, and a Superfund cleanup project was being planned for the creek. Independent news site Hell Gate subsequently reported that test boats had repeatedly run aground in Coney Island Creek and that sand had returned to the creek after it was partially dredged in 2021.

References

External links
 ConeyIslandCreek.org
 Coney Island's Untamed Creek, Caught Between Past & Future
CONEY ISLAND CREEK: An Uncertain Future

Bodies of water of Brooklyn
Brighton Beach
Coney Island
Inlets of New York (state)